JNBridge is a privately owned independent software vendor that provides interoperability software between Java and Microsoft .NET frameworks. The company was founded in 2001 and is based in Boulder, Colorado, USA.

History
JNBridge was founded in 2001 at a time when Sun Microsystems and Microsoft were embroiled in antitrust lawsuits over the compatibility of Java on Microsoft's platforms.

The first commercially available version of JNBridgePro was released on June 3, 2002. It supported accessing Java classes from .NET. Subsequent versions added accessing .NET classes from Java, support for transactions and plug-ins for Visual Studio and Eclipse.

JNBridge released two new products in 2007, JMS (Java Message Service) adapters for BizTalk and for .NET.

In 2012 JNBridge introduced a line of software labs that demonstrate how to connect diverse technologies.

Products

JNBridgePro - Java & .NET Interoperability
JNBridgePro is a Java and .NET interoperability tool that enables developers to build cross-platform applications that run in the same process or across a network, on the ground or in the cloud.

JNBridge JMS Adapter for .NET
The JNBridge JMS Adapter for .NET  provides integration of JMS (Java Message Service) capabilities into Microsoft .NET applications.

JNBridge JMS Adapter for BizTalk Server
The JNBridge JMS Adapter for BizTalk Server provides integration of JMS capabilities into Microsoft BizTalk Server applications.

Labs
 Integrate Java- and Mono-based microservices using Docker
 Use the Play Framework to create a Java web application on top of a .NET back-end
 Create a .NET-based Visual Monitoring System for Hadoop
 Build a LINQ provider for HBase MapReduce
 Create .NET-based MapReducers for Hadoop
 Using a Java SSH Library to Build a BizTalk Adapter

External links
JNBridge's Official Website
New versions of JNBridge to support Java 8

See also
Java
.NET Framework

References

Technology companies of the United States
Privately held companies based in Colorado
Companies based in Boulder, Colorado